János Henzsel (born 12 August 1881, date of death unknown) was a Hungarian cyclist. He competed in two events at the 1912 Summer Olympics.

References

External links
 

1881 births
Year of death missing
Hungarian male cyclists
Olympic cyclists of Hungary
Cyclists at the 1912 Summer Olympics
People from Nyíregyháza
Sportspeople from Szabolcs-Szatmár-Bereg County